Avelino Cadilla (1918 – 1974) was a Uruguayan footballer. He played in two matches for the Uruguay national football team in 1937 and 1941. He was also part of Uruguay's squad for the 1937 South American Championship.

References

External links
 

1918 births
1974 deaths
Uruguayan footballers
Uruguay international footballers
Place of birth missing
Association football defenders
Club Atlético River Plate (Montevideo) players
Club Nacional de Football players
Club Atlético River Plate footballers
Uruguayan expatriate footballers
Expatriate footballers in Argentina